Christiane Krüger (born 8 September 1945 in Hamburg, Germany) is a German actress. She is the daughter of actor Hardy Krüger.

Selected filmography

Cinema
 Forty Eight Hours to Acapulco (1967)
 The Man with the Glass Eye (1969)
Das Gesicht im Dunkeln (Double Face, 1969)
De Sade (1969)
Fluchtweg St. Pauli – Großalarm für die Davidswache (Jailbreak in Hamburg, 1971)
Little Mother (1973)
The Internecine Project (1974)
Auch ich war nur ein mittelmäßiger Schüler (1974)
 (1982)
Le Dernier Combat (1983)
Eine Frau für gewisse Stunden (1985)
 (1985)
Alles Bob! (1999)

Television
11 Uhr 20 (1970)
Star Maidens (1976, science fiction series)
Les Brigades du Tigre - Season 3, Episode 3: "Don de Scotland Yard" (1976)
Es muss nicht immer Kaviar sein (1977)
Golden Soak (1979)
Derrick - Season 7, Episode 6: "Die Entscheidung" (1980)
Derrick - Season 7, Episode 9: "Zeuge Yuroski" (1980)
Arsène Lupin joue et perd (1980)
Derrick - Season 8, Episode 10: "Tod im See" (1981)
Derrick - Season 10, Episode 2: "Die Tote in der Isar" (1983)
Derrick - Season 10, Episode 7: "Lohmanns innerer Frieden" (1983)
Derrick - Season 12, Episode 7: "Ein unheimlicher Abgang" (1985)
Anne of Green Gables (1985)
Derrick - "Eine Endstation" (1994)
Der Mann ohne Schatten - "Die Entführung" (1996)
The Lost Daughter (1997)
Derrick - "Der Entscheider" (1996)
Ich schenk dir meinen Mann 2 (2001)
Unser Charly - "Retter in der Not" (2006)
SOKO 5113 - "Spurwechsel" (2006)

Theatre
Munich Kammerspiele
Residenz Theatre Munich
Salzburger Festspiele

External links

Peter Reinholz Agency Munich 

German television actresses
German film actresses
20th-century German actresses
21st-century German actresses
Actresses from Hamburg
1945 births
Living people